Choreutis orthogona is a moth in the family Choreutidae. It was described by Edward Meyrick in 1886. It is found in India, Sri Lanka, Myanmar, Celebes and New Guinea.

The larval host plant is Psoralea corylifolia.

References

Choreutis
Moths described in 1886